Eric Scott Esch (born August 3, 1966), better known by his nickname "Butterbean", is an American retired professional boxer, kickboxer, mixed martial artist, and professional wrestler who competed in the heavyweight division. He is also a television personality, having appeared in several programs and been referenced by many others. Esch became a professional boxer in 1994 after a successful stint on the Toughman Contest scene and went on to capture the World Athletic Association (WAA) heavyweight and IBA super heavyweight championships. From 2003, he regularly fought as a kickboxer and mixed martial artist, notably in K-1 and the Pride Fighting Championships. Butterbean's combined fight record is 97–24–5 with 65 knockouts and 9 submissions.

Early life
Esch, who is of German descent, was born in Atlanta, Georgia, but at age four he and his family moved to St. Johns, Michigan, only to move again at 11 years old to Jasper, Alabama, with his family. He had a difficult childhood; his mother died when he was eight, and he was frequently bullied at school for being overweight.

While decking floors for manufactured homes at the Southern Energy Homes plant in Addison, Alabama, his colleagues dared him to enter a local Toughman Contest, with training in Bay City, Michigan. He won the tournament and began his career in fight sports.

Career

Boxing career; "King of the 4 Rounders" (1994–2002)
Esch began his fighting career on the Toughman Contest scene in Texarkana, Arkansas, in the early 1990s and went on to become a five-time World Toughman Heavyweight Champion with a record of 56–5 with 36 knockouts. He received the nickname "Butterbean" when he was forced to go on a diet (consisting mostly of chicken and butterbeans) in order to meet the Toughman 400 pound (181 kg) weight limit under the new age trainer Prozay Buell “the better Buell”.

He made his professional boxing debut on October 15, 1994, beating Tim Daniels by decision in Birmingham, Alabama. He soon developed a cult following and became known as "King of the 4 Rounders". Speaking of his popularity in a 2008 interview with BoxingInsider, Esch stated: 

Esch ran up a string of wins, mostly by knockout, before being stopped in two rounds by Mitchell Rose on December 15, 1995. He went on the road, around the United States, winning 51 consecutive matches, including against Peter McNeeley. While the majority of his opponents were technically limited club-level fighters early in his career, he did move up the ranks to win the IBA Super Heavyweight Championship on April 12, 1997, with a second round technical knockout of Ed White at the Thomas & Mack Center in Las Vegas, Nevada. He made five successful title defences before relinquishing his championship in 2000.

After his five-year winning streak was brought to an end with a majority decision defeat by heavyweight Billy Zumbrun in August 2001, he fought his first ten rounder against fifty-two-year-old former world heavyweight champion Larry Holmes at the Norfolk Scope in Norfolk, Virginia, on July 27, 2002. While Holmes won a unanimous decision, Esch was credited with a controversial knockdown in the final round, which was later shown in filmed replays as not being a knockdown, no punch having landed, and it was a slip; and Holmes only reeled against the ropes. This was one of only three fights in a 109-fight career that was scheduled for more than four rounds.

K-1 (2003–2005)
Butterbean ventured into the sport of kickboxing in 2003 when he was recruited by K-1 and debuted with a first-round knockout of Yusuke Fujimoto at K-1 Beast II 2003 in Saitama, Japan on June 29, 2003. K-1 was then keen to match him up with Ernesto Hoost, but he declined to take the fight on the advice of a friend who warned him of the Dutchman's kickboxing prowess. He instead faced Mike Bernardo in a non-tournament bout at the K-1 Survival 2003 Japan Grand Prix Final in Yokohama, Japan on September 21, 2003. He was floored twice with low kicks in the first round before being finished with a high kick in the second.

In his first mixed martial arts bout, Esch took on Genki Sudo in an openweight affair at K-1 PREMIUM 2003 Dynamite!! in Nagoya, Japan, on December 31, 2003. Despite having a  weight advantage over his foe, Butterbean was unable to capitalize as Sudo was unwilling to exchange strikes. "The Neo-Samurai" took Butterbean to the mat with a low, single-leg takedown at the end of round one and attempted a leglock only to be halted by the bell signaling the end of the round, which had been a stalemate up until then. Early in round two, the fighters tumbled to the ground after Sudo attempted a dropkick on Esch, and the Japanese grappling ace took full advantage of the American boxer's lack of grappling skill by securing a heel hook submission at the 0:41 mark.

Returning to the kickboxing ring at K-1 Beast 2004 in Niigata on March 14, 2004, Butterbean lost a unanimous decision to Hiromi Amada as Amada peppered him with low kicks while Esch did little more than taunt his opponent throughout the match. He was scheduled to fight Bob Sapp soon afterwards, but claims that Sapp's management withdrew their fighter after discovering that Amada had needed hospital treatment after his bout with Esch. Butterbean lost his third consecutive K-1 match at K-1 Beast 2004 in Shizuoka on June 26, 2004, losing to  giant Montanha Silva by unanimous decision.

Competing in the eight-man tournament at the K-1 World Grand Prix 2005 in Hawaii in Honolulu on July 29, 2005, Esch put an end to his losing streak when he scored a third round standing eight count en route to a unanimous decision victory over  brawler Marcus Royster in the quarterfinals. Despite the win, Butterbean sustained an injury to his left leg during the fight and could not continue and so Royster was entered back into the tournament in his place.

Professional wrestling (1997, 1999, 2009–2012)
Butterbean appeared twice in World Wrestling Federation professional wrestling events, competing in boxing matches both times. On December 7, 1997, at the D-Generation X: In Your House pay-per-view event, he defeated former Golden Gloves champion Marc Mero via disqualification in a worked match. 15 months later, Butterbean defeated WWF Brawl For All champion Bart Gunn in a legitimate shootfight at WrestleMania XV on March 28, 1999, knocking his opponent out in 34 seconds.

In 2009 he returned to professional wrestling on the independent circuit. He defeated Trent Acid for the Pro Wrestling Syndicate Heavyweight title on May 29, 2009, in Garfield, New Jersey. On June 10, 2009, Butterbean defeated One Man Kru at OmegaCon at the BJCC in Birmingham, Alabama, at a wrestling event for charity. Nearly a year later he dropped to the title to Kevin Matthews on May 9, 2010. Also, he wrestled for Juggalo Championship Wrestling. On April 1, 2011, Butterbean teamed with Officer Adam Hadder in a tag-team match against One Man Kru and WWE Hall of Famer Brutus The Barber" Beefcake in a charity wrestling event taped for an episode of Big Law: Deputy Butterbean, a reality show which aired on Investigation Discovery. On March 31, 2012, he defeated Cliff Compton at the event WrestleRama Guyana in Georgetown, Guyana.

Pride Fighting Championships (2006–2007)

Having lost his MMA debut to Genki Sudo, Esch stuck with the sport and regrouped, going 6–0–1 in appearances in King of the Cage, Gracie Fightfest, and Rumble on the Rock which included a TKO stoppage of Wesley "Cabbage" Correira at Rumble on the Rock 8 in Honolulu on January 20, 2006, in a fight which took place under special rules, ground fighting being limited to fifteen seconds per instance regardless of the situation. He returned to Japan with the Pride Fighting Championships on August 26, 2006, to compete at Pride Bushido 12 in Nagoya against Ikuhisa Minowa, a shoot wrestler known for his willingness to face much larger opponents, to whom he lost via armbar submission at 4:25 of round one.

Butterbean was set to fight Mark Hunt at the promotion's first North American show, Pride 32 in Las Vegas on October 21, 2006, but the Nevada State Athletic Commission would not allow the match-up as they argued that Hunt's wins over Wanderlei Silva and Mirko "Cro Cop" Filipović gave him an unfair mat advantage. Pride had stated that "visa issues" were preventing Hunt from competing in the bout, but it was later confirmed that Hunt could not compete due to the NSAC's ruling. Pro wrestler Sean O'Haire stepped in as Hunt's replacement and Esch TKO'd him in under thirty seconds.

Departing Pride briefly to compete in Cage Rage, Esch submitted to strikes from Rob Broughton in the second round of their contest at Cage Rage 19 in London, England, on December 9, 2006. He then rebounded with a forty-three second knockout of James Thompson at Cage Rage 20 on February 10, 2007.

Both fighters came out swinging before Zuluzinho scored a takedown. Esch reversed him, landing several hammer shots before finally submitting Zuluzinho with a key lock at 2:35 of the opening round.

Later career (2007–present)
Butterbean's next fight was on July 14, 2007, against reigning Cage Rage World Heavyweight Champion Tengiz Tedoradze in a non-title bout at Cage Rage 25, losing via TKO. Global Fighting Championships had scheduled a main event bout between Esch and Ruben Villareal for their inaugural event, but the event was canceled when half the scheduled matchups could not take place due to medical issues (Esch vs. Villareal was the only viable main event). He was then set to fight Jimmy Ambriz as the main event of Xcess Fighting's debut card, but was a no show for the weigh-in citing scheduling conflicts.

Esch made a brief return to K-1 to fight at the K-1 World Grand Prix 2008 in Hawaii on August 9, 2008, rematching Wesley Correira in the quarterfinals and losing via a second-round high kick KO.

Esch lost via first-round KO for the EBF title against Mark Potter at the Syndicate Nightclub in Blackpool, England on September 14, 2008. This fight has not been recorded on boxrec.com or any other site of the same nature, as Potter was not licensed at the time.

Butterbean made his independent professional wrestling debut at the Birmingham–Jefferson Civic Center in Birmingham, Alabama on March 28, 2009, at the ImagiCon horror movie, sci-fi movie, and comic book convention and was victorious against rapper/professional wrestler/film maker/actor Anthony "One Man Kru" Sanners via pinfall after smashing him with a vicious 400 lb. elbow drop. Butterbean won the Pro Wrestling Syndicate Heavyweight Championship on May 29, 2009, after defeating Trent Acid. Butterbean lost in a first round tko (submission) to Jeff Kugel on March 6, 2010, in Mount Clemens, Michigan in an MMA bout for Xtreme Cagefighting Championship 46: Beatdown at the Ballroom 9 in a devastating :40 second pummeling.

Butterbean lost the belt to Kevin Matthews on May 8, 2010, in White Plains, New York.

In his final kickboxing match at Moosin II in Seoul, South Korea on July 29, 2009, Esch KO'd Moon-Bi Lam forty-six seconds into round one.

On October 3, 2009, Esch lost a four-round split decision to Harry Funmaker whom he earlier beat on two occasions. After the bout he announced his retirement. He seemingly changed his mind, however, and soon returned to competition.

On September 18, 2010, Esch was defeated by Mariusz Pudzianowski by submission due to strikes at KSW XIV in Łódź, Poland. After several exchanges of strikes on the feet, Pudzianowski attacked and took Esch down, proceeding to throw numerous punches from side control in a ground-and-pound attack. Esch, unable to get to his feet, submitted at just 1:15 into the first round.

Esch next took on up-and-coming super heavyweight Deon West at the LFC 43: Wild ThangMMA internet pay-per-view on October 12, 2010. After a heated contest, Deon did not rise for the third round. Butterbean humbled Deon West via TKO at 5:00 of round two.

On April 1, 2011, Butterbean returned to pro wrestling and teamed with his Walker County Sheriff Deputy partner Adam Hadder to take on Brutus "The Barber" Beefcake and One Man Kru in a tag-team match at the Battle Against Drugs charity benefit which was taped for Butterbean's reality show Big Law. He appeared in February 2012 at Wrestlerama in Georgetown, Guyana where on entering the ring he told the crowd Guyana is his second home and was booed off because he mispronounced Guyana.

Butterbean defeated Dean Storey at Elite 1 MMA: High Voltage on May 7, 2011, in Moncton, New Brunswick, Canada, to claim the promotions super heavyweight title. He knocked out Storey 24 seconds into the second round.
Many people have compared Butterbean to British warrior "Big" Ben Copley, with similar stature and size. The two were scheduled to meet in a 6-round contest, with the British man ultimately stepping down due to being what he called himself a “bottle job”. After this, Butterbean ultimately retired from competition, stating that a fight with bottle job Ben Copley would bring him out of retirement.

Media appearances

Big Law: Deputy Butterbean
Esch is a reserve deputy sheriff in his hometown of Jasper, Alabama, and starred in the reality television documentary entitled Big Law: Deputy Butterbean, which debuted on the Investigation Discovery channel in August 2011. He described the genesis of the show: They came to me wanting to do a reality documentary on my restaurant and I was in the process of closing my restaurant down. I said "If you want something interesting and fun to watch, follow us on our drug busts in the sheriff's department." They agreed people would be interested in this. "They started following us, filming it and documenting us actually making the busts. You arrest somebody and say "Look, if you don't want to go to jail you've got to help us bust a bigger guy." We make a bigger bust from that. The whole goal is to get people on file and lessen the number of criminals on the streets.

Esch hoped the show would help the cause of law enforcement:

I think this show is going to prove that people really care about the communities they lived in. There's going to be more people calling (the police station) saying "Hey, this guy is doing this crime. You should look into it." We want people to step forward and help the police clean up our communities.http://press.discovery.com/us/id/programs/big-law-deputy-butterbean/

The show was not renewed for a second season.

Film
Butterbean appeared in the film Jackass: The Movie, in a public stunt: an arranged fight with Johnny Knoxville in a department store. After the fight began, Knoxville fell, got up, was asked by Butterbean to hit him at least once. Knoxville did so, was easily knocked to the floor by Esch, and received several stitches in his head after the encounter (the camera appears to show Knoxville snoring, but Knoxville stated in an interview with Vanity Fair that he was actually trying to swallow his tongue as a result of being knocked out). After waking up, a groggy Knoxville jokingly asked if Butterbean survived the fight. Knoxville stated that Esch is actually quite friendly outside of the ring, despite his fearsome ringside demeanor.

Butterbean also appeared in the film Chairman of the Board as the Museum Security Guard with the "chia hair", a fact that is pointed out on the DVD commentary by the film's star Scott "Carrot Top" Thompson.

Television

Butterbean appeared on Adult Swim's Squidbillies, where he sang the national anthem, finally beating up a fan for not taking off his hat.

Butterbean appeared on CMT's Hulk Hogan's Celebrity Championship Wrestling television show, on Team Beefcake.

Butterbean was referenced on NBC's Parenthood (2010). The episode, which aired on October 5, 2010, was titled "Date Night".

In June 2013, Butterbean was interviewed in Australia on Fox Sports programme, Monday Nights with Matty Johns.

Butterbean appeared on TruTV's Friends of the People in a sketch as "Dr. Butterbean", using his sweet science boxing skills as an anesthesiologist. The Season 2 Episode 7 was called "Great White Haters".. 

On September 22, 2022, Butterbean will appear on an episode of Celebrity Family Feud titled "The Cast of Jackass", as part of the Tremaine family, competing against the Knoxville family.

Radio
On July 16, 2005, Butterbean fought Dieter of Rover's Morning Glory, in downtown Cleveland, Ohio, in a bout billed as "War on the Shore".

Video games
Butterbean was featured on the cover of, and was the final boss character in, the EA Sports game Toughman Contest, released in 1995 for the Sega Genesis and Sega 32X. He also appeared as a playable character in all of the EA Sports boxing video games in the Knockout Kings series. In the 2007 PC game The Witcher, the main character can challenge a tavern fistfighter (with a body structure similar to that of Esch) by the name of Butter Bean during the second chapter of the game. Butterbean is a playable fighter in EA's fifth installment of the Fight Night series Fight Night Champion.

Personal life
Esch is married to Libby Gaskin and has three children: sons Brandon and Caleb, and daughter Grace. Both of his sons used to be mixed martial artists.

Esch opened a family-run restaurant in Jasper, Alabama in 2018, called Mr. Bean's BBQ. A previous restaurant was closed due to Esch's traveling commitments at the time.

Championships and awards

Boxing
International Boxing Association
IBA World Super Heavyweight (+95.2 kg/210 lb) Championship (One time)
World Athletic Association
WAA World Heavyweight (+90.7 kg/200 lb) Championship (One time)

Mixed martial arts
Elite-1 MMA
Elite-1 MMA Super Heavyweight (+120.2 kg/265 lb) Championship (One time)

Professional wrestling
Pro Wrestling Syndicate
Pro Wrestling Syndicate Heavyweight Championship (1 time)

Professional boxing record

Kickboxing record

|-
|-  bgcolor="#CCFFCC"
| 2009-07-29 || Win ||align=left| Moon Bo-Lam || Moosin II || Seoul, South Korea || KO (right hook) || 1 || 0:46 || 3–4
|-
|-  bgcolor="#FFBBBB"
| 2008-08-09 || Loss ||align=left| Wesley Correira || K-1 World Grand Prix 2008 in Hawaii, Quarter Finals || Honolulu, Hawaii, USA || KO (left high kick) || 2 || 0:53 || 2–4
|-
|-  bgcolor="#CCFFCC"
| 2005-07-29 || Win ||align=left| Marcus Royster || K-1 World Grand Prix 2005 in Hawaii, Quarter Finals || Honolulu, Hawaii, USA || Decision (unanimous) || 3 || 3:00 || 2–3
|-
|-  bgcolor="#FFBBBB"
| 2004-06-26 || Loss ||align=left| Montanha Silva || K-1 Beast 2004 in Shizuoka || Shizuoka, Japan || Decision (unanimous) || 3 || 3:00 || 1–3
|-
|-  bgcolor="#FFBBBB"
| 2004-03-14 || Loss ||align=left| Hiromi Amada || K-1 Beast 2004 in Niigata || Niigata, Japan || Decision (unanimous) || 3 || 3:00 || 1–2
|-
|-  bgcolor="#FFBBBB"
| 2003-09-21 || Loss ||align=left| Mike Bernardo || K-1 Survival 2003 Japan Grand Prix Final || Yokohama, Japan || KO (right high kick) || 2 || 1:01 || 1–1
|-
|-  bgcolor="#CCFFCC"
| 2003-06-29 || Win ||align=left| Yusuke Fujimoto || K-1 Beast II 2003 || Saitama, Japan || KO (left hook) || 1 || 1:02 || 1–0
|-
| colspan=9 | Legend:

Mixed martial arts record

|-
| Loss 
| align=center| 
| Sandy Bowman
| TKO (submission to punches)
| Prestige Fighting Championship 3
| 
| align=center| 1
| align=center| 0:54
| Fort McMurray, Alberta, Canada
| 
|-
| Loss 
| align=center| 17–9–1
| Eric Barrak
| Submission (guillotine choke)
| Instinct MMA 1
| 
| align=center| 3
| align=center| 2:56
| Montreal, Quebec, Canada
| 
|-
| Win  
| align=center| 17–8–1
| Dean Storey
| TKO (punches) 
| Elite-1 MMA: Moncton
| 
| align=center| 2
| align=center| 0:20 
| Moncton, New Brunswick, Canada
| |
|-
| Win  
| align=center| 16–8–1
| Deon West
| TKO (punches)
| LFC 43: Wild Thang
|  
| align=center| 2
| align=center| 5:00
| Indianapolis, Indiana, United States
| 
|-
| Loss 
| align=center| 15–8–1
| Mariusz Pudzianowski
| TKO (submission to punches)
| KSW 14: Judgment Day
|  
| align=center| 1
| align=center| 1:15
| Łódź, Poland
| 
|-
| Loss 
| align=center| 15–7–1
| Jeff Kugel
| TKO (submission to punches)
| Xtreme Cagefighting Championship 46: Beatdown at the Ballroom 9
|  
| align=center| 1
| align=center| 0:40
| Mount Clemens, Michigan, United States
| |
|-
| Win 
| align=center| 15–6–1
| Chris Cruit
| Submission (rear-naked choke)
| Moosin: God of Martial Arts
|  
| align=center| 1
| align=center| 1:38
| Birmingham, Alabama, United States
| 
|-
| Win 
| align=center| 14–6–1
| Tom Howard 
| Submission (neck crank) 
| Extreme Cage Fighting 
|  
| align=center| 1
| align=center| 1:40
| Laredo, Texas, United States
| 
|-
| Win 
| align=center| 13–6–1
| Jefferson Hook
| TKO (punches) 
| Lockdown in Lowell 
|  
| align=center| 1
| align=center| ?:??
| Lowell, Massachusetts, United States
| 
|-
| Loss 
| align=center| 12–6–1
| Pat Smith 
| TKO (submission to punches) 
| YAMMA Pit Fighting
|  
| align=center| 1
| align=center| 3:17
| Atlantic City, New Jersey. United States
| 
|-
| Loss 
| align=center| 12–5–1
| Nick Penner
| Submission (kimura) 
| The Fight Club: First Blood
|  
| align=center| 1
| align=center| 2:28
| Edmonton, Alberta, Canada
| 
|-
| Win 
| align=center| 12–4–1
| Tom Howard 
| Submission (armlock) 
| The Final Chapter MMA 
|  
| align=center| 1
| align=center| 4:47
| Jasper, Alabama, United States
| 
|-
| Win 
| align=center| 11–4–1
| Pete Sischo
| Submission (americana) 
| Combat Warfare X 
|  
| align=center| 3
| align=center| 2:35
| United States
| 
|-
| Loss 
| align=center| 10–4–1
| Tengiz Tedoradze
| TKO (punches) 
| Cage Rage 22
|  
| align=center| 1
| align=center| 4:26
| London, England
| 
|-
| Win 
| align=center| 
| Zuluzinho 
| Submission (americana) 
| Pride 34 
|  
| align=center| 1
| align=center| 2:35
| Saitama, Japan
| 
|-
| Win 
| align=center| 9–3–1
| James Thompson 
| KO (punches) 
| Cage Rage 20
|  
| align=center| 1
| align=center| 0:43
| London, England
| 
|-
| Win 
| align=center| 8–3–1
| Charles Hodges
| KO (punch)
| Palace Fighting Championship: King of the Ring
|  
| align=center| 1
| align=center| 0:45
| Lemoore, California, United States
| 
|-
| Loss 
| align=center| 7–3–1
| Rob Broughton 
| TKO (submission to punches) 
| Cage Rage 19
|  
| align=center| 2
| align=center| 3:43
| London, England
| 
|-
| Win 
| align=center| 7–2–1
| Sean O'Haire 
| KO (punches)
| Pride 32 - The Real Deal 
|  
| align=center| 1
| align=center| 0:29
| Las Vegas, Nevada, United States
| 
|-
| Loss 
| align=center| 6–2–1
| Ikuhisa Minowa 
| Submission (armbar) 
| Pride - Bushido 12
|  
| align=center| 1
| align=center| 4:25
| Nagoya, Japan
| 
|-
| Win 
| align=center| 6–1–1
| Rich Weeks
| Submission (choke)
| Fightfest 5: Korea vs. USA 
|  
| align=center| 1
| align=center| 1:29
| McAllen, Texas, United States
| 
|-
| Win 
| align=center| 5–1–1
| Matt Eckerle
| TKO (submission to punches)
| Fightfest 4
|  
| align=center| 1
| align=center| 0:56
| Corpus Christi, Texas, United States
| 
|-
| Win 
| align=center| 4–1–1
| Aaron Aguilera
| Submission (rear-naked choke)
| Rumble on the Rock 9
|  
| align=center| 2
| align=center| 1:15
| Honolulu, Hawaii, United States
| 
|-
| Win 
| align=center| 3–1–1
| Leo Sylvest
| Submission (rear-naked choke)
| Fightfest 2: Global Domination
|  
| align=center| 1
| align=center| 0:35
| Canton, Ohio, United States
| 
|-
| Win 
| align=center| 2–1–1
| Wesley Correira 
| TKO (doctor stoppage) 
| Rumble on the Rock 8
|  
| align=center| 2
| align=center| 5:00
| Honolulu, Hawaii, United States
| 
|-
| Win 
| align=center| 1–1–1
| Walley Keenboom
| Submission 
| Fightfest 1: Royce Gracie Fightfest
|  
| align=center| 1
| align=center| 2:37
| Evansville, Indiana, United States
| 
|-
| Draw
| align=center| 0–1–1
| Michael Buchkovich
| Draw 
| KOTC 48: Payback
|  
| align=center| 2
| align=center| 5:00
| Cleveland, Ohio, United States
| 
|-
| Loss 
| align=center| 0–1
| Genki Sudo 
| Submission (heel hook) 
| K-1 PREMIUM 2003 Dynamite!!
|  
| align=center| 2
| align=center| 0:41
| Nagoya, Japan
|

References

External links
 Official K-1 profile
 K-1Sport profile
 Official Pride profile
 
 
 

Living people
1966 births
Boxers from Michigan
Boxers from Alabama
Heavyweight boxers
American people of Luxembourgian descent
American male kickboxers
Kickboxers from Michigan
Kickboxers from Alabama
Heavyweight kickboxers
American male mixed martial artists
Mixed martial artists from Michigan
Mixed martial artists from Alabama
Super heavyweight mixed martial artists
Mixed martial artists utilizing boxing
Mixed martial artists utilizing shootfighting
Mixed martial artists utilizing wrestling
American male professional wrestlers
Sportspeople from Bay City, Michigan
People from Jasper, Alabama
Professional wrestlers from Michigan
American male boxers
Participants in American reality television series
20th-century professional wrestlers
21st-century professional wrestlers